Cynthia Gail Baum is an American clinical psychologist and academic administrator serving as provost and vice president for academic affairs at Thomas Edison State University. She was the president of Walden University and the chancellor of Argosy University.

Education 
Baum earned a bachelor of science in psychology at Denison University. She has a master of science and doctor of philosophy in clinical psychology from the University of Georgia. Her 1982 dissertation was titled "Psychological and social factors associated with adolescent obesity.

Career 
Baum is a clinical psychologist. She was a full-time faculty member of Virginia Tech and Catholic University of America. Baum is a former assistant executive director for education of the American Psychological Association. Baum served as the executive vice president of Walden University. In 2012, she was appointed as the 9th president, replacing Jonathan A. Kaplan. In 2015, Baum became the chancellor of Argosy University. She is provost and vice president for academic affairs at Thomas Edison State University.

References 

Living people
Year of birth missing (living people)
American women psychologists
20th-century American psychologists
21st-century American psychologists
20th-century American women scientists
21st-century American women scientists
University of Georgia alumni
Virginia Tech faculty
Catholic University of America faculty
Heads of universities and colleges in the United States
Argosy University faculty
Denison University alumni
Thomas Edison State University faculty
American women academics
Women heads of universities and colleges
American clinical psychologists